Teutonic was an unincorporated community in Marshall County, West Virginia.

References 

Unincorporated communities in West Virginia
Unincorporated communities in Marshall County, West Virginia